Systems-oriented design (S.O.D.) uses system thinking in order to capture the complexity of systems addressed in design practice. The main mission of S.O.D. is to build the designers' own interpretation and implementation of systems thinking. S.O.D. aims at enabling systems thinking to fully benefit from design thinking and practice, and design thinking and practice to fully benefit from systems thinking. S.O.D. addresses design for human activity systems, and can be applied to any kind of design problem ranging from product design and interaction design, through architecture to decision making processes and policy design.

Background 
Design is getting more and more complex for a number of reasons, for example due to globalization, need for sustainability, and the introduction of new technology and increased use of automation. Many of the challenges designers meet today can be considered wicked problems. The characteristics of a wicked problem include among others that there are no definitive formulation of the problem and that the solutions are never true-or-false, but rather better or worse. A traditional problem solving approach is not sufficient in addressing for such design problems. S.O.D. is an approach that addresses the challenges the designer faces when working with complex systems and wicked problems, providing tools and techniques which makes it easier for the designer to grasp the complexity of the problem at hand. With a systems-oriented approach towards design, the designer acknowledges that the starting point for the design process is constantly moving, and that "every implemented solution is consequential. It leaves "traces" that cannot be undone." (see Rittel and Webber's 5th property of wicked problems).

Designers are well suited to work with complexity and wicked problems for a number of reasons:
 They are trained and experienced in creative thinking and idea generation;
 They know how to synthesize solutions from complex and fuzzy material;
 Designers have an ability to visualize, which is an enormous advantage for understanding and communicating complexity.

S.O.D. emphasizes these abilities as central and seeks to further train the designer in systems thinking and systems practice as a skill and an art.

Origins 
Systems-oriented design builds on systems theory and systems thinking in order to develop practices for addressing complexity in design. Particularly influential is soft systems methodology (SSM), acknowledging conflicting worldviews and people's purposeful actions, and a systems view on creativity. However, S.O.D. is inspired by critical systems thinking and approaches systems theories in an eclectic way transforming the thoughts of the different theories to fit the design process. The design disciplines build on their own traditions and have a certain way of working with problems, often referred to as design thinking or the design way. Design thinking is a creative process based around the "building up" of ideas. This style of thinking is one of the advantages of the designer and is the reason why simply employing one of the existing systems approach into design, like for example systems engineering, is not found sufficient by the advocates of S.O.D.

Compared with other systems approaches, S.O.D. is less concerned with hierarchies and borders of systems, modelling and feedback loops, and more focused on the whole fields of relations and patterns of interactions. S.O.D. seeks richness rather than simplification of the complex systems.

Systems thinking in the design process 
Important in the systems-oriented design process is to carry out activities in order to grasp the complexity of the system designed for, and to accommodate for a creative process taking place. In order to gain the necessary understanding of the complex system, a comprehensive data capture and analysis phase is needed. Visualizations play a vital role in the design process, both as a means to analyze and understand the information gathered, and in order to communicate. The obtained insight into the complex system is used to come up with solutions for the design problem.

Methods and techniques from other disciplines are used in order to understand the complexity of the system, including for example ethnographic studies, risk analysis, and scenario thinking. Methods and concepts unique to S.O.D. include for example the Rich Design Space, GIGA-mapping, and Incubation Techniques.

The Rich Design Space includes the physical space of the design studio with sketches, ideas, mood boards, plans etc. and the virtual digital design space of the design software, media like video and sound recording, traditional design techniques and even the social space created in the project. By paying attention to the richness of the design space, the design space can become a very efficient tool to maintain an overview of the complexity of the project all the way.

GIGA-mapping is the central tool for registering, analyzing and managing complexity in S.O.D.. It is used for systematizing and interrelating the information and knowledge obtained.

Incubation is one of the 4 proposed stages of creativity: preparation, incubation, illumination, and verification. Incubation Techniques are techniques used by the designer in order to acquire the background knowledge needed for an incubation process to take place.

S.O.D. has proved valuable for designers to quickly acquire knowledge of a new domains, and to reveal unexpected parts of a system where a new design can be beneficial.

Further development and applications 
The concept of systems-oriented design was initially proposed by professor Birger Sevaldson at the Oslo School of Architecture and Design (AHO) in the context of the OCEAN design research network. The S.O.D. approach is currently under development through teaching and research projects, as well as through the work of design practitioners. AHO provides Master courses in Systems Oriented Design each term as part of their Industrial Design program. In these courses, design students are trained in using the tools and techniques of S.O.D. in projects with outside partners. Research projects in systems-oriented design are carried out at the Centre for Design Research at AHO in order to develop the concept, methods and tools further. In 2016 the project Systemic Approach to Architectural Performance was announced as an institutional cooperation between the Faculty of Art and Architecture at the Technical University of Liberec and the Oslo School of Architecture and Design. Its mission is to link the methodology of systems-oriented design with performance-oriented architecture on the case study Marie Davidova's project Wood as a Primary Medium to Architectural Performance.
The Oslo-based design consultancy Halogen (www.halogen.no) has used SOD extensively with a varied range of customers. They have suggested a typology of Gigamaps and contributed with other methodological developments.
Gigamapping and other SOD methods are used by a growing range of businesses and educational institutions.

See also 
 Creative problem solving process
 Creativity techniques
 Systems thinking

Notes

References

External links 
 Systems Oriented Design (website provided by the Oslo School of Architecture and Design)

Design